The Grand Rapids metropolitan area is a triangular shaped Metro Triplex, in West Michigan, which fans out westward from the primary hub city of Grand Rapids, Michigan, to the other two metro hubs of Muskegon and Holland. The metropolitan area had an estimated population of 1,059,113 in 2017. The region, noted in particular for its western edge abutting the Lake Michigan shoreline and its beaches, is a popular tourist and vacation destination during the summer. Noted popular metro area beach towns include Grand Haven, Holland, Muskegon, and Saugatuck.

The metropolitan area is home to many attractions. Frederik Meijer Gardens & Sculpture Park is located in the outskirts of Grand Rapids. Michigan's Adventure theme park is just north of Muskegon, and the Grand Rapids Art Museum and the DeVos Place Convention Center are both in downtown Grand Rapids. The Grand River flows through the metropolitan area and is noted for its fishing, kayaking, and canoeing.

Definitions

The Grand Rapids-Kentwood Metropolitan Statistical Area, as defined by the United States Census Bureau, is an area consisting of four counties in western Michigan, anchored by the cities of Grand Rapids and Wyoming. The MSA had a population of 988,938 at the 2010 census. It comprises four counties which include the central county of Kent, and the outlying counties of Ionia, Montcalm, and Ottawa.

The Grand Rapids – Kentwood – Muskegon Combined Statistical Area is the 2nd largest CSA in the U.S. state of Michigan (behind Metro Detroit). The CSA had a population of 1,320,064 at the 2010 census. The primary cultural and financial centers of the region are Grand Rapids, Muskegon and Holland. It includes the four counties in the Grand Rapids-Kentwood MSA plus one metropolitan area, adding the Muskegon, MI MSA of Muskegon County, and two micropolitan areas of Holland of Allegan County, and Big Rapids of Mecosta County for a total of seven counties.

The Grand Rapids metropolitan area is part of the Great Lakes Megalopolis containing an estimated 54 million people.

Communities

Places with more than 50,000 inhabitants
 Grand Rapids (Principal city of MSA and CSA)
 Wyoming (Principal City of MSA and CSA)
 Kentwood (Principal city of MSA and CSA)

Places with 20,000 to 50,000 inhabitants
 Allendale Charter Township
 Byron Township
 Gaines Charter Township
 Georgetown Charter Township
 Holland
 Holland Charter Township
 Muskegon (Principal city of CSA)
 Norton Shores
 Plainfield Charter Township
 Walker

Places with 10,000 to 20,000 inhabitants
 Ada Township
 Allendale (CDP)
 Alpine Township
 Big Rapids
 Caledonia Township
 Cannon Township
 Cascade Charter Township
 Comstock Park (CDP)
 Cutlerville (CDP)
 East Grand Rapids
 Forest Hills (CDP)
 Fruitport Charter Township
 Grand Haven
 Grand Haven Charter Township
 Grand Rapids Charter Township
 Grandville
 Ionia
 Jenison (CDP)
 Muskegon Charter Township
 Muskegon Heights
 Park Township
 Northview (CDP)
 Spring Lake Township

Places with 5,000 to 10,000 inhabitants

 Algoma Township
 Belding
 Blendon Township
 Boston Township
 Courtland Township
 Dalton Township
 Dorr Township
 Egelston Township
 Fruitland Township
 Greenville
 Gun Plain Township
 Hudsonville
 Jamestown Charter Township

 Laketon Township
 Laketown Township
 Lowell Charter Township
 Oakfield Township
 Otsego Township
 Robinson Township
 Rockford
 Solon Township
 Sparta Township
 Tallmadge Charter Township
 Thornapple Township
 Zeeland
 Zeeland Charter Township

Places with 2,500 to 5,000 inhabitants

 Allegan
 Allegan Township
 Ashland Township
 Beechwood (CDP)
 Berlin Township
 Big Prairie Township
 Bowne Township
 Brooks Township
 Byron Center (CDP)
 Casco Township
 Casnovia Township
 Cedar Creek Township
 Cedar Springs
 Coopersville
 Crockery Township
 Croton Township
 Danby Township
 Easton Township
 Ensley Township
 Ferrysburg
 Fillmore Township

 Fremont
 Ganges Township
 Garfield Township
 Grant Township
 Grattan Township
 Heath Township
 Holton Township
 Hopkins Township
 Ionia Township
 Lee Township
 Leighton Township
 Lowell
 Lyons Township
 Manlius Township
 Martin Township
 Middleville
 Nelson Township
 North Muskegon
 Odessa Township
 Olive Township
 Orleans Township
 Otsego

 Overisel Township
 Plainwell
 Portland
 Portland Township
 Port Sheldon Township
 Ravenna Township
 Roosevelt Park
 Salem Township
 Saugatuck Township
 Sheridan Charter Township
 Sparta
 Spencer Township
 Trowbridge Township
 Tyrone Township
 Vergennes Township
 Wayland
 Wayland Township
 Whitehall
 Wolf Lake (CDP)
 Wright Township

Places with fewer than 2,500 inhabitants

 Barton Township
 Beaver Township
 Berlin Township
 Blue Lake Township
 Bridgeton Township
 Caledonia
 Campbell Township
 Casnovia
 Cheshire Township
 Chester Township
 Clarksville
 Clyde Township
 Dayton Township
 Denver Township
 Douglass
 Everett Township
 Fennville
 Fruitport
 Goodwell Township
 Grant
 Hesperia

 Home Township
 Hopkins
 Hubbardston (partial)
 Keene Township
 Kent City
 Lakewood Club
 Lake Odessa
 Lilley Township
 Lincoln Township
 Lyons
 Martin
 Merrill Township
 Moline
 Monroe Township
 Montague Township
 Monterey Township
 Moorland Township
 Muir
 Newaygo
 North Plains Township
 Norwich Township

 Orange Township
 Otisco Township
 Pewamo
 Polkton Charter Township
 Ravenna
 Ronald Township
 Sand Lake
 Saranac
 Saugatuck
 Sebewa Township
 Sherman Township
 Sullivan Township
 Troy Township
 Twin Lake (CDP)
 Valley Township
 Watson Township
 Whitehall Township
 White Cloud
 White River Township
 Wilcox Township

Unincorporated places

 Ada
 Alaska
 Alto
 Belmont
 Bitely
 Brunswick
 Campau Corner
 Cannonsburg
 Cascade
 Comstock Park
 Cooks Corners

 Dutton
 Eastmanville
 Marne
 Orleans
 Palo
 Pullman
 Riverview
 Smyrna
 Wabaningo
 Woodland Park

Demographics

2010 Census
As of the census of 2010, there were 774,160 people, 290,340 households, and 197,867 families residing within the MSA. The racial makeup of the MSA was 83.1% White, 8.1% African American, 0.5% Native American, 1.9% Asian, 0.03% Pacific Islander, 3.8% from other races, and 2.7% from two or more races. Hispanic or Latino of any race were 8.4% of the population.

2000 Census
As of the census of 2000, there were 740,482 people, 272,130 households, and 188,192 families residing within the MSA. The racial makeup of the MSA was 85.71% White, 7.40% African American, 0.53% Native American, 1.51% Asian, 0.05% Pacific Islander, 2.82% from other races, and 1.99% from two or more races. Hispanic or Latino of any race were 6.02% of the population.

The median income for a household in the MSA was $43,251, and the median income for a family was $49,715. Males had a median income of $37,853 versus $25,483 for females. The per capita income for the MSA was $19,173.

Grand Rapids-Kentwood Metropolitan Statistical Area

Education

 Aquinas College
 Calvin College
 Cornerstone University
 Davenport University
 Grace Christian University
 Grand Rapids Community College
 Grand Valley State University
 Hope College
 Kuyper College
 Kendall College of Art and Design
 Muskegon Community College 
 Thomas M. Cooley Law School
 Western Theological Seminary

The area also has campuses for Baker College, Ferris State University, Davenport University, Western Michigan University, and University of Phoenix, and the Michigan State University College of Human Medicine.

Economy

Companies in the Grand Rapids metropolitan area
 Alticor (formerly Amway), Ada
 American Seating, Grand Rapids
 Baker Books, Grand Rapids
 Bissell, Grand Rapids
 Eerdmans, Grand Rapids
 Family Christian Stores, Grand Rapids
 Farmers Insurance Group, Grand Rapids
 GE Aviation, Cascade
 Gentex, Zeeland
 Gerber Products Company, Fremont
 Goodrich Quality Theaters, Grand Rapids
 Gordon Food Service, Wyoming
 Haworth, Holland
 Herman Miller, Zeeland
 Howard Miller, Zeeland
 Loeks Theatres, Wyoming
 Meijer, Walker
 Mercantile Bank of Michigan, Grand Rapids
 Old Orchard Brands, Sparta
 Perrigo, Allegan
 Plascore Incorporated, Zeeland
 SpartanNash, Byron Township
 Steelcase, Grand Rapids
 Sun Chemical, Muskegon
 Universal Forest Products, Grand Rapids
 Wolverine World Wide, Rockford
 X-Rite, Kentwood
 Zondervan Publishing, Cascade

Culture and tourism

 Centerpointe Mall
 The Lakes Mall
 Rivertown Crossings Mall
 Tanger Outlet Mall
 Woodland Mall

 Frederik Meijer Gardens & Sculpture Park
 Grand Rapids Public Museum

See also

 Michigan census statistical areas

References

 
Geography of Kent County, Michigan
Geography of Barry County, Michigan
Geography of Ionia County, Michigan
Geography of Newaygo County, Michigan
West Michigan
Metropolitan areas of Michigan